The Mendiola Football Club 1991 is a Filipino professional football club. The club is named after Mendiola Street, a short thoroughfare in the San Miguel district of Manila. It is one of the founding members of United Football League, which was last competing in the 2009–10 season. The team now plays in the Philippines Football League, the top-flight league of football in the Philippines.

History
Mendiola FC 1991's roots can be traced back to the football program of San Beda College (now San Beda University). It all began in the summer of 1991, the San Beda senior football team based in Mendiola Street joined a prestigious league held in Manila which was composed of the armed forces teams, various clubs and universities. Due to lack of available players, they decided to invite more players from different universities, thus forming the Mendiola Football Club, which resulted to a respectable 4th-place finish in the said tournament.

Following the success, the club has grown and became one of the pioneering teams joining the first semi-professional league in 1997, Manila Premier Football League.

In 1997, Mendiola joined the U19 Adidas Cup clinching the tournament's title.

Since then, the club has been consistently participating in first and second division football leagues throughout the country, such as Globe Super Cup 2001, Filipino Premier League 2008, United Football League from 2009 to 2011 and in the 2011 Smart National Football Club Championship under the banner Smart-San Beda FC where they finished 2nd overall.

PFF National Men's Club Championship
At the 2011 PFF National Men's Club Championship, Mendiola played under the name Smart San Beda F.C. for sponsorship reasons. Global Teknika emerged the champions after defeating them in a 3-2 aggregate score in the finals.

In 2012, the club resurgent by joining the 2012–13 UFL Cup and defeating FC Masbate 4–0 in Stage 1.

Philippine Premier League
Mendiola was announced by the Philippine Premier League organizers as one of the seven teams of the league's inaugural season in 2019. However Mendiola was ruled ineligible to play for the 2019 season by the Philippine Football Federation due to licensing issues. The start of the league was delayed to April 2019 to allow Mendiola and Philippine Air Force F.C. settle their licensing issues. However, the league itself folded after the Philippine Football Federation (PFF) revoked its sanction.

Philippines Football League
After the dissolution of the short-lived PPL, Mendiola along with Air Force joined the revived Philippines Football League. They debuted in the 2019 season under a provisional license and placed fifth out of seven clubs.

Prior to the start of the 2020 season, the club announced that Ricardo Penson, a sponsor, is funding the construction of a stadium in San Beda's campus in Taytay, Rizal which will serve as the home venue of the club. The venue is part of the club's final requirement to acquire a full club license from the PFF. However, for most of the 2020 season, the club will hold home matches at the Rizal Memorial Stadium in Manila and is negotiation with the local government of Imus, Cavite to host later matches at the Imus Grandstand.

In 2021, Mendiola secured an AFC club license for the first time making it eligible to qualify for the AFC Cup.

Players

First team squad

Personnel
As of 3 March 2020

Kit manufacturers and shirt sponsors

1 Major shirt sponsor (names located at the front of the shirt).
2 Secondary sponsor (names mostly located at the sleeves and at the back of the shirt).

Kit evolution

Home

Away

Honors

Domestic

Cups
 PFF National Men's Club Championship
Runners-up: 2011

Records

Key
Tms. = Number of teams
Pos. = Position in league
TBD  = To be determined
DNQ  = Did not qualify
Note: Performances of the club indicated here was after the Philippine Football League created (as a semi-pro league) in 1995.

References

External links
Mendiola United FC info

Football clubs in the Philippines
Mendiola
Association football clubs established in 1991
1991 establishments in the Philippines
Sports teams in Metro Manila